John Frederick Kaiser (born June 6, 1962) is a former professional American football player who played linebacker for four seasons for the Seattle Seahawks and Buffalo Bills.

References 

1962 births
Living people
People from Oconomowoc, Wisconsin
Players of American football from Wisconsin
American football linebackers
Arizona Wildcats football players
Seattle Seahawks players
Buffalo Bills players
Sportspeople from the Milwaukee metropolitan area